The Virginia Cavaliers men's squash team is the intercollegiate men's squash team for the University of Virginia located in Charlottesville, Virginia. The team competes in the College Squash Association. The head coach of the team is Mark Allen.

Players

Current roster 
Updated February 2023.

|}

Notable former players 
Notable alumni include:

References

External links 
 

 
Squash in Virginia
College men's squash teams in the United States
Sports clubs established in 2017
2017 establishments in Virginia